Konstantin Yuryevich Korotkov (born 18 July 1961) is a Soviet speed skater. He competed in the men's 10,000 metres event at the 1984 Winter Olympics.

References

1961 births
Living people
Soviet male speed skaters
Olympic speed skaters of the Soviet Union
Speed skaters at the 1984 Winter Olympics
Sportspeople from Oskemen